Richard Warren Hacker (October 6, 1947 – April 22, 2020) was a Major League Baseball player, base coach and scout. Hacker played 16 games for the Montreal Expos in the 1971 season as a shortstop. He had a .121 batting average, with four hits in 33 at-bats. Hacker attended Southern Illinois University. After his playing career Hacker became a coach.

Coaching
Hacker was a base coach in the Major Leagues from 1986 to 1993, coaching for the St. Louis Cardinals from 1986–90 and the Toronto Blue Jays from 1991–93. Hacker coached first base for the Cardinals from 1986–87 and third base from 1988–90. He was the third base coach for the Blue Jays from 1991–93. He coached in two World Series (1987 and 1992) and was on the Blue Jays bench for a third (1993). He also coached in the 1988 Major League Baseball All-Star Game.

Hacker was seriously hurt in a car accident on the Martin Luther King Bridge in St. Louis in July 1993, when he collided with a driver who was racing. The accident ended his career. During his recovery from injury he remained a member of the Blue Jays coaching staff, but was transferred to off-field work such as creating hitting charts of opposing teams. He was replaced as third base coach by Nick Leyva.

Personal life
Hacker and his wife Kathryn lived in Belleville, Illinois, and had three grown children. He remained an active hunter and amateur baseball scout. He was a member of the New Athens High School Hall of Fame. Hacker's uncle was former Major Leaguer, Warren Hacker. Hacker died on April 22, 2020 in Fairview Heights, Illinois, due to leukemia.

See also
 List of St. Louis Cardinals coaches

References

External links

1947 births
2020 deaths
Amarillo Gold Sox players
American expatriate baseball players in Canada
Baseball coaches from Illinois
Baseball players from Illinois
Deaths from cancer in Illinois
Deaths from leukemia
Major League Baseball first base coaches
Major League Baseball shortstops
Major League Baseball third base coaches
Mankato Mets players
Memphis Blues players
Montreal Expos players
Peninsula Whips players
St. Louis Cardinals coaches
San Diego Padres scouts
Southern Illinois Salukis baseball players
Sportspeople from Belleville, Illinois
Toronto Blue Jays coaches
Toronto Blue Jays scouts
Visalia Mets players
Winnipeg Whips players